Andrew Mackintosh Jack (born 30 June 1923) is a Scottish former footballer who played as a centre forward in the Football League for Tranmere Rovers.

References

1923 births
Possibly living people
Footballers from Glasgow
Association football forwards
Scottish footballers
Tranmere Rovers F.C. players
Hamilton Academical F.C. players
English Football League players
Scottish Football League players